Navdeep Singh (born 24 January 1974) is an Indian former first-class cricketer. He is now an umpire and has stood in matches in the 2015–16 Ranji Trophy and the final of the 2016–17 Vijay Hazare Trophy.

References

External links
 

1974 births
Living people
Indian cricketers
Indian cricket umpires
Punjab, India cricketers
Cricketers from Chandigarh